The 1998–99 Magyar Kupa (English: Hungarian Cup) was the 60th season of Hungary's annual knock-out cup football competition.

Quarter-finals
Games were played on March 16 and March 17, 1999.

|}

Semi-finals
Games were played on April 14 and April 15, 1999.

|}

Final

See also
 1998–99 Nemzeti Bajnokság I

References

External links
 Official site 
 soccerway.com

1998–99 in Hungarian football
1998–99 domestic association football cups
1998-99